Myung-jun, also spelled Myeong-jun or Myŏng-jun, is a Korean masculine given name. Its meaning differs based on the hanja used to write each syllable of the name. There are 19 hanja with the reading "myung" and 34 hanja with the reading "jun" on the South Korean government's official list of hanja which may be registered for use in given names. People with this name include: 

Cho Myung-jun (born 1970), South Korean field hockey coach
Yoon Myung-june (born 1989), South Korean baseball pitcher
Ri Myong-jun (born 1990), North Korean footballer in Thailand
Seo Myung-joon (born 1992), South Korean freestyle skier
MJ (born Kim Myung-jun, 1994), South Korean singer, member of Astro
Son Myeong-jun (born 1994), South Korean long-distance runner
Kim Myeong-joon, South Korean film director

See also
List of Korean given names

References

Korean masculine given names